The 2017–18 Luxembourg Cup is the 93rd version of the football knockout tournament. This competition began on 9 September 2017. The winners of the cup will earn a spot in the 2018–19 Europa League and would begin play in the first qualifying round.

F91 Dudelange are the defending champions after winning the previous season's Luxembourg Cup by defeating Fola Esch in the final by a score of 4–1.

Format
This season's Cup will be a single elimination knockout tournament contested between 104 clubs. Matches which are level after regulation will advance to extra time and then to penalties to determine a winner.

Preliminary round
Four preliminary round matches were played.

First round
Thirty-six first round matches were played 9–10 September 2017.

Second round
Thirty-two second round matches were played 21–24 September 2017. The second round draw was held 11 September 2017.

Third round
Sixteen third round matches were played 27 and 29 October 2017. The third round draw was held on 2 October 2017.

Fourth round
Eight fourth round matches were played on 25 March 2018 and 4 April 2018. The fourth round draw was held on 30 October 2017.

Quarter–finals
Four quarter–final matches were played on 18 April 2018. The quarter–final round draw was held on 5 April 2018.

Semi–finals
The semi–final matches are scheduled to be played on 9 May 2018. The semi–final round draw was held on 20 April 2018.

Final

See also
 2017–18 Luxembourg National Division

References

External links
uefa.com
FLF

2017-18
Luxembourg
Cup